Don Federico de Roncali y Ceruti, 1st Count of Alcoy (31 May 1806, in Cádiz –4 April 1857, in Madrid) was a Spanish noble, politician and military who served as Prime Minister of Spain between 1852 and 1853. He held other important offices such as Captain General of Cuba and Minister of State.

Alcoy was the second son of Agustín de Roncali y Martínez de Murcia, Knight of Santiago, and his wife María del Carmen Ceruti y Feit. His eldest brother was Joaquín de Roncali, 1st Marquis of Roncali, also a prominent politician in the reign of Isabella II of Spain.

|-
 

|-

Counts of Spain
Prime Ministers of Spain
Foreign ministers of Spain
Governors of Cuba
1809 births
1857 deaths
Moderate Party (Spain) politicians
19th-century Spanish politicians